The 2011 Selangor FA Season is Selangor FA's 6th season playing soccer in the Malaysia Super League Since its inception in 2004.

Selangor FA began the season on 10 January 2011. They will also compete in two domestic cups; The FA Cup Malaysia and Malaysia Cup.

Malaysia Super League

Malaysia FA Cup
As defending league champions, Selangor received a bye in the first round.

Second round

Quarter-finals
The first leg matches will be played on 9 March 2010, with the second legs to be held on 20 March 2010.

Semi-finals
The first leg matches will be played on 30 March 2010, with the second legs to be held on 3 April 2010.

Malaysia Cup

Group stage

Group D

Knockout stage

Bracket

References

Selangor
Selangor FA